"Modern Love" is a column published in The New York Times that was started in 2004. It appears in the Style section on Sundays. It has spawned a podcast and a TV series by the same name.

References

External links 

 

Works originally published in The New York Times
Columns (periodical)